The Finnish Army (Finnish: Maavoimat, Swedish: Armén) is the land forces branch of the Finnish Defence Forces. The Finnish Army is divided into six branches: the infantry (which includes armoured units), field artillery, anti-aircraft artillery, engineers, signals, and materiel troops. The commander of the Finnish Army since 1 January 2022 is Lieutenant General Pasi Välimäki.

Role
The duties of the Finnish Army are threefold. They are:
Defence of the land area of the realm
Support of civilian authorities
International military crisis management operations

In addition to these tasks, the Army is responsible for conscription and personnel management of reserve.

Because Finland is not under direct military threat, the current Army is, as it has been since the end of Second World War, in peacetime training formation. This means that its brigades are not meant to be operational combat units but training formations. According to the "troop production" doctrine, peacetime units will train each batch of conscripts they receive for a specific wartime unit. After the end of training, the conscripts are demobilised into reserve. During regular refresher exercises and in case of a crisis, the reserve unit will be activated and deployed in the formation it trained in during conscription. Thus, the peacetime structure of the Army does not give any meaningful information about the mobilised structure or about the areas where the units would be used.

History of the Finnish Army

Between 1809 and 1917 Finland was an autonomous part of the Russian Empire as the Grand Duchy of Finland. Between 1881 and 1901 the Grand Duchy had its own army. Before that several other military units had also been formed while Finland belonged to Sweden.

The Grand Duchy inherited its allotment system from the Swedish military organization. However, for several decades, Russian rulers did not require military service from Finland; operations and defence were mostly taken care by Russian troops based in the Grand Duchy. As a result, officer benefits of the allotment system became practically pensions, as payment was based on passive availability, not on actual service.

During the Napoleonic Wars three 1200-man regiments were formed in Finland and Topographic Corps in Hamina. In 1821 the Topographic Corps was transformed into the cadet officers school. In 1829 one of the training battalions was transformed into the Young Guard Battalion, the Finnish Guards. 

During the Crimean War, 1854, Finland set up nine sharpshooter battalions based on a rota system. Conscription was introduced in Finland in 1878. The Finnish Guard took part in fighting to suppress the 1830 November Uprising in Poland and participated in the Russo-Turkish War (1877–1878), after which it gained the status of Old Guard of the Russian Emperor.

The Finnish army was gradually broken up during the "oppression years" just after the turn of the century. As Finnish conscripts refused to serve in the Russian Imperial Army, conscription ended in Finland and it was replaced with a tax paid from the Finnish Senate to the Imperial treasury.

At the end of the 19th century the Russian empire was weakening, and this was reflected in a reduced capacity of the Russian troops to keep public order. Voluntary defence organizations disguised as fire brigades were formed by the Finnish people, especially during the strikes during and after the Russo-Japanese War.

There were socialist Red Guards and conservative, anti-socialist Protection Guards (or White Guards). Also, during the First World War activists secretly travelled to Germany to receive military training and to be trained as Jäger troops (in finnish jääkärit, in swedish jägare).

After independence and beginning of the Finnish Civil War the White government declared the White Guards as government troops, and the war was fought between the Red Guards, assisted by Communist Russians, and White Guards added with the Jägers and assisted by the German Empire.

After the war in 1919, the Protection Guards became a separate organization. Therefore, strictly speaking, there is no continuity between the White Guards, which became a voluntary organization, and the Finnish army, which was a cadre army based on conscription. However, Jägers gained important positions in the army, and German tactics and military principles were adopted.

Winter War

The Finnish Army consisted of 9 field divisions, 4 brigades and a number of small independent battalions and companies at the beginning of the Winter War in 1939. The Army was organised into three corps. The II and III Corps were organised into the Army of the Isthmus which was located on the Karelian Isthmus, the likely location for the main Soviet attack. The IV Corps defended the area north of Lake Ladoga. The defence of the rest of the border up to Petsamo by the Arctic Ocean was given to the North Finland Group which consisted of a handful of independent battalions.

In order to organize replacements for the units a Field Replacement Brigade (Kenttätäydennysprikaati, KT-Pr) of nine battalions was formed. But due to the severity of the Soviet attack the battalions had to be used as combat troops. Also three Replacement Divisions or Home Replacement Divisions (1.Koti.TD – 3.Koti.TD) were formed from the available reservists. As the situation became more alarming the 1st and 3rd Replacement Divisions were reformed into the 21st and 23rd Divisions and sent to the front on 19 December. The 2nd Replacement Division was deployed as individual regiments to Northern Finland.

Finland ceded 9% of its territory via the Moscow Peace Treaty but prevented the Soviet Union from annexing Finland.

Order of battle

Army of the Isthmus
Army of the Isthmus (Kannaksen Armeija, KannA) under Lieutenant General Hugo Österman was located on the Karelian Isthmus.
 II Corps (II AK) under Lieutenant General Harald Öhquist
 4th Division
 5th Division
 11th Division
 III Corps (III AK) under Major General Erik Heinrichs.
 8th Division
 10th Division
 Reserve
 1st Division

Four delaying groups, named for their location, were stationed immediately by the border on the isthmus.

Independent formations
 IV Corps (IV AK) (in the Ladoga Karelia) under Major General Juho Heiskanen (from 4 December 1939 on Major General Woldemar Hägglund).
 12th Division
 13th Division
 North Finland Group (Pohjois-Suomen Ryhmä) under Major General Wiljo Tuompo.
 Lapland Group (Lapin Ryhmä) in Salla and Petsamo
 North Karelian Group (Pohjois-Karjalan Ryhmä) in North Karelia

Reserves of C-in-C
 6th Division (Southern Finland)
 9th Division (Northern Finland)
 Field Replacement Brigade (KT-Pr)

Continuation War

The Army of Karelia was formed on 29 June 1941 soon after the start of the Continuation War. There were seven Finnish corps in the field during the war: the I, II, III, IV, V, VI and VII. During the war the Finnish Army was responsible for the front from the Gulf of Finland to Kainuu. The front in Northern Finland was the responsibility of the German AOK Norwegen. During summer and autumn 1941, the Finnish Army re-conquered the areas lost to the Soviet Union in the Winter War and pushed deep into Soviet territory in Eastern Karelia. In winter 1942, the Finnish political leadership ended offensive action and the front stagnated for over two years.

The relatively inactive period of stationary war ended abruptly in June 1944, as the Soviet Union started its Fourth Strategic Offensive. As a result, the Finnish Army lost large areas of the Karelian Isthmus, most importantly Viipuri, a major city, and was forced to retreat from Eastern Karelia. However, in the decisive Battle of Tali-Ihantala, the Soviet advance was halted. The Soviet Union concentrated its forces for the battles in Central Europe, and Finland made a separate peace in September 1944.

Lapland War

The Lapland War (Finnish: Lapin sota) was the hostilities between Finland and Nazi Germany between September 1944 and April 1945, fought in Finland's northernmost Lapland Province. While the Finns saw this as a separate conflict much like the Continuation War, German forces considered their actions to be part of the Second World War. A peculiarity of the war was that the Finnish army was forced to demobilise their forces while at the same time fighting to force the German army to leave Finland. The German forces retreated to Norway, and Finland was therefore able to uphold its armistice promise to the Soviet Union.

Cold War 
During the Cold War, Finland was neutral but maintained close ties to the Soviet Union. The Finnish Army was in a sticky situation as it bordered the Soviet Union. Porkkala was a Soviet naval base taken from Finland in 1944. Construction for it finished in 1945 and became a naval base. It was handed back to Finland in 1956, for Kaliningrad had become a better place for the Soviet Navy.

Organisation

The Army is organised into eight Peacetime brigades. Two of these brigades, Army Academy and Utti Jaeger Regiment do not have subordinate regional offices. The six other brigades have one or more subordinate regional offices and a deputy commander. During a crisis, the regional offices form provincial local battalions and the brigade headquarters form the regional command level. During normal situation, the regional offices are responsible for conscription, organising voluntary national defence work and planning crisis  time activities.

The brigades are:
Armoured Brigade, Parola and Riihimäki
Army Academy, Lappeenranta and Hamina 
Guard Jaeger Regiment, Helsinki
Jaeger Brigade, Sodankylä and Rovaniemi
Kainuu Brigade, Kajaani
Karelia Brigade, Valkeala
Pori Brigade, Säkylä and Niinisalo
Utti Jaeger Regiment, Utti

Army logistics is part of the joint Finnish Defence Forces Logistics Command.

During war time the army is organised operative forces which consists of approximately 61 000 men and territorial forces which consist of 176 000 men.

The following list is the wartime organisation of the Finnish army from 1.1.2008

Operative forces:
3 readiness brigades (1 armoured brigade)
2 jaeger brigades
2 mechanised battlegroups
1 helicopter battalion
1 special jaeger battalion
1 anti-aircraft missile and anti-aircraft unit
Territorial forces:
6 infantry brigades
14 independent battalions / battlegroups
28 Territorial Forces (Finland) (company sized)

Equipment

Major weapon systems used by the army include:
 239 main battle tanks
 212 infantry fighting vehicles
 394 armoured personnel carriers (APCs) (tracked)
 707 APCs (wheeled)
 1,679 mortars
 740 towed artillery pieces
 82 (40) self-propelled artillery pieces
 75 multiple launch rocket systems
 27 helicopters
 66 unmanned aerial vehicles
 +1068 anti-aircraft artillery
 346 surface-to-air missiles systems

See also
 Ski warfare
 List of Finnish corps in the Winter War
 List of Finnish divisions in the Winter War
 M05 military camouflage pattern

References

External links
 Finnish Army website

 
Army